Nazrin Choudhury is a British screenwriter and actress of Bangladeshi descent, best known for her radio dramas and extensive work in American television.

Early life
Choudhury was born in South West London, England to parents of Bangladeshi origin. She graduated with a BSc in Biomedical Science from King's College London, and completed an MA in Screenwriting at the Northern Film School, having received a FilmFour Productions/Channel 4 Award.

Career
Choudhury scripted episodes of British television serials such as Casualty, Doctors, EastEnders and Waterloo Road. She also worked as a storyline writer on Coronation Street. Her  radio play Mixed Blood won the Richard Imison Award in 2006.

In 2006, she was awarded a grant for the arts by the Arts Council England for her first novel My England. Her first screenplay Scum won the "Focus on Talent" award, a competition run by DNA Films.

Choudhury was selected as one of the ten finalists for the 2014 Fox Writers Intensive. She moved to the United States and has written for Fox's Houdini and Doyle, Wayward Pines, Amazon's Jack Ryan and most recently written and produced on Fear the Walking Dead. On 17 September 2020, she was announced as the writer of American Radical for Universal, based the memoir written by Kevin Maurer and Tamer Elnoury. It is to be directed by Sam Esmail.

Personal life
Choudhury is currently based in Los Angeles and is married.

Filmography

Writer

Actor

See also
 List of British Bangladeshis

References

External links
 
 Time To Read – Nazrin Choudhury
 Lang, Kirsty. Nazrin Choudhury: Imison winner 2006. BBC Radio 4. October 2006

Living people
Year of birth missing (living people)
English people of Bangladeshi descent
British women screenwriters
English screenwriters
English television writers
English soap opera writers
Women soap opera writers
English women novelists
British Asian writers
21st-century English writers
21st-century English women writers
Writers from London
English television actresses
English stage actresses
English actresses of South Asian descent
English television producers
People educated at Streatham and Clapham High School
People from London
Alumni of King's College London
Alumni of the Northern Film School
British women television producers
21st-century British screenwriters
British women television writers